Thaali Bhagyam is a 1966 Indian Tamil-language film produced and directed by K. B. Nagabhushanam. The film, starring M. G. Ramachandran, B. Saroja Devi and M. N. Nambiar, was released on 27 August 1966.

Plot 

The families of Nallasivam and Murugan have been neighbours for generations. Nallasivam is nurturing his wish to give his daughter Valli in marriage to Murugan. Meanwhile, a bride search for Nallasivam is on and Murugan accompanies Nallasivam along with others to see a bride, Kamalam. Kamalam, thinking Murugan is the groom agrees for the marriage, and finds it is otherwise on the day of the marriage. In a passionate moment, Kamalam misbehaves with Murugan, which is seen by Namchivayam, a tax collector. Namchivayam takes this opportunity to blackmail Kamalam and get her to do things against Murugan. How Murugan foils their plans and how finally truth prevails is what the film is all about.

Cast 
M. G. Ramachandran as Muruga alias Murugan
B. Saroja Devi as Valli
M. N. Nambiar as  Namchivayam
Nagesh as Singaran, Namchivayam's brother-in-law
C. R. Parthiban
S. V. Subbaiah as Nallasivam
V. Nagayya as Kamalam's father
M. N. Rajam as Kamalam
M. V. Rajamma as Parvathi
Manorama as Anjalai
M. S. S. Packiyam as Chellam, Namchivayam's wife
Rushyendramani as Kamalam's mother
K. S. Parvathi
S. M. Thirupadhiswamy as Singapore Sivalingam
N. S. Natarajan as Rangan, bandit

Production 
M. G. Ramachandran initially wanted M. A. Thirumugam to direct the film; however, K. B. Nagabhushanam insisted on directing, as well as producing.

Soundtrack 
The music was composed by K. V. Mahadevan and lyrics written by Vaali.

Release 
Thaali Bhagyam was released on 27 August 1966. The film ran for over 300 days at Liberty theatre in Madras.

References

External links 
 

1960s Tamil-language films
1966 films
Films scored by K. V. Mahadevan